Thomas Coates may refer to:

Tommy Coates (1909–1980), stock car driver
Thomas Coates (musician) (1803–1895), the "Father of Band Music in America"
Thomas J. Coates (born 1945), director of the UCLA Center for World Health

See also
Thomas Coats (disambiguation)
Thomas Cotes (died 1641), English printer
Thomas Glen-Coats (disambiguation)